The 1971 World Series of Poker (WSOP) was a series of poker tournaments held at Binion's Horseshoe during May 1–15, 1971. This was only the 2nd installment of the World Series of Poker, but unlike at the 1970 event, freezeout tournaments were played to decide the winner of the main title. The freezeout structure replaced the cash games, and it was kept in use ever since. 5 freezeouts were played in total—4 preliminary events and the Main Event—each featuring a different poker variant. The preliminary events required player to put up a buy-in of $1K, while the Main Event buy-in was $5K.

Preliminary events

Main Event

There were 6 entrants to the main event, each paying $5K to enter the tournament.  The game played was no limit Texas hold 'em. Johnny Moss won the tournament and took the whole prize pool. Moss's victory that year was the 1st time a player had been awarded the Main Event Championship 2 years in a row, a feat that would later be also accomplished by Doyle Brunson (in 1976 and 1977), Stu Ungar (in 1980 and 1981), and Johnny Chan (in 1986 and 1987).

Final table

References

External links
Official site

World Series of Poker
World Series of Poker